Barry Ashworth (born 18 August 1942) is an English former footballer.

Playing career
Ashworth was playing Non-League football for Bangor City before he joined Southend United in 1963. Spells with Hartlepools United and Tranmere Rovers followed, before moving to Chester in time for 1967–68.

At Chester, Ashworth had a reputation as a popular but volatile player. In his final season at the club (1969–70) he was twice hit with six-week suspensions for disciplinary reasons. The second suspension led to him being placed on the transfer list and he ended his career in The Football League, joining Altrincham. He went on to play for Ellesmere Port Town before a second spell with Altrincham.

Ashworth later returned to Bangor and enjoyed a spell as caretaker player-manager of the club.

References

External links
 

1942 births
Living people
Footballers from Stockport
English Football League players
English footballers
English football managers
Association football midfielders
Bangor City F.C. players
Southend United F.C. players
Hartlepool United F.C. players
Tranmere Rovers F.C. players
Chester City F.C. players
Altrincham F.C. players
Bangor City F.C. managers
Ellesmere Port Town F.C. players